Zoltán Tessely (born 1967) is a Hungarian teacher and politician, member of the National Assembly (MP) for Bicske (Fejér County Constituency VII then III) since 2010. He became mayor of Bicske in September 2008, when he was elected during a by-election after the death of his predecessor János Szántó.

He joined Fidesz in 2002. He was elected MP for Bicske during the 2010 Hungarian parliamentary election. He won the local election in Bicske on October 3, 2010, as an incumbent office-holder. He is a member then Vice Chairman of the Committee on European Affairs since May 14, 2010.

Tessely was appointed Prime Ministerial Commissioner responsible for the regional development of St. Ladislaus and Vál Valleys on 1 January 2016.

Personal life
He is married. His wife is Ildikó Czéghér. They have together three daughters, Anna Júlia, Borbála and Eszter.

References

1967 births
Living people
Mayors of places in Hungary
Fidesz politicians
Members of the National Assembly of Hungary (2010–2014)
Members of the National Assembly of Hungary (2014–2018)
Members of the National Assembly of Hungary (2018–2022)
Members of the National Assembly of Hungary (2022–2026)
Politicians from Budapest